Mark Cameron Burry  (born 24 February 1957) is a New Zealand architect. He is the Foundation Director of Swinburne University of Technology’s Smart Cities Research Institute.

Previous to that, he was the Professor of Innovation and Director of the Spatial Information Architecture Laboratory and founding Director of the Design Research Institute at RMIT University, Melbourne, Australia. He is also executive architect and researcher at the Sagrada Familia basilica in Barcelona, Catalonia, Spain.

Early life and family
Born in Christchurch, New Zealand in 1957, Burry is the son of All Black Hugh Burry. He studied architecture at the University of Cambridge, receiving a BA in architecture in 1979, a Diploma in Architecture in 1982 and an MA in architecture in 1989.

Research, collaboration and teaching
Previously, Burry has been a visiting professor at University of Liverpool, the Massachusetts Institute of Technology, the Universitat Politècnica de Catalunya and Victoria University of Wellington. He has collaborated with Gehry Partners LLP, dECOi Paris, Foster and Partners and Arup and was a member of the Prime Minister's Science, Engineering and Innovation Council in 2005 as part of the working group examining the role of creativity in the innovation economy.

Awards
 Officer of the Order of Australia, 2018
 Federation Fellowship, Australian Research Council, 2006
 Award for Innovative Research, ACADIA, 2006
 Achiever Award (Creative Melbourne), Committee for Melbourne, 2004
 Diploma I la insignia a l’acadèmic correspondent, Reial Acadèmia Catalana de Belles Arts de Sant Jordi, 2003

Bibliography 
Burry has published widely on the Sagrada Família, digital architecture and design computing. He is a member of the Architectural Design editorial board.

Books
 The Innovation Imperative: Architecture of Vitality (with Pia Ednie-Brown and Andrew Burrow), Chichester: John Wiley & Sons, 
 Scripting Cultures: Architectural Design and Programming, Chichester: John Wiley & Sons, 2011, 
 Sagrada Familia sXXI: Gaud ara-ahora-now (with Jordi Coll Grifoll and Josep Gomez Serrano), Ediciones UPC: Barcelona, 2010, 
 The New Mathematics of Architecture (with Jane Burry), London: Thames & Hudson, 2010, 
 Gaudi Unseen: Completing the Sagrada Familia (ed.), JOVIS Verlag: Berlin, 3008, 
 La Sagrada Família: de Gaudí al CAD (with Jordi Coll, Josep Gomez, Juan Melero), Ediciones UPC: Barcelona, 1996, 9788483011485
 The Expiatory Church of the Sagrada Família, London: Phaidon Press, 1993,

References

External links 
 Design Research Institute
 Spatial Information Architecture Laboratory
 La Sagrada Familia
 Curriculum vitae
 Interview on "George Negus Tonight", ABC TV, 19/04/2004
 "In Gaudi's shadow", The Age newspaper, 02/07/2002

1957 births
Living people
Architecture educators
New Zealand architects
Academic staff of RMIT University
Academic staff of the Victoria University of Wellington
People from Christchurch
Alumni of the University of Cambridge
Officers of the Order of Australia